The Polytechnic University of the Philippines, Santa Rosa Campus or PUP-SRC
() is one of the two extension campuses of the university system in Laguna, Philippines. It is located in the Sinalhan, Santa Rosa, Laguna, and was established in 2016
.

Location

Polytechnic University of the Philippines - Sta. Rosa Campus (PUP-SRC) is currently located at Looban ni Karyo, Brgy. Sinalhan, Santa Rosa City, Laguna.

External links 
 Polytechnic University of the Philippines – Official website

Universities and colleges in Laguna (province)
Education in Santa Rosa, Laguna
Educational institutions established in 2003
Polytechnic University of the Philippines
2003 establishments in the Philippines